Erynniola is a genus of tachinid flies in the family Tachinidae from Madagascar.

Species
M. atricolor Mesnil, 1977
M. russipes Mesnil, 1977

References

Exoristinae
Diptera of Africa
Endemic fauna of Madagascar
Tachinidae genera